is a Japanese football player currently playing for FC Ryukyu.

Club career stats
'Updated to 23 February 2019.

References

External links
Profile at Ehime FC

Profile at Consadole Sapporo 

1986 births
Living people
Okinawa University alumni
Association football people from Okinawa Prefecture
Japanese footballers
J1 League players
J2 League players
Hokkaido Consadole Sapporo players
Ehime FC players
FC Ryukyu players
Association football defenders